Gmina Godów is a rural gmina (administrative district) in Wodzisław County, Silesian Voivodeship, in southern Poland. Its seat is the village of Godów.

Villages
The gmina contains the villages of Godów, Gołkowice, Krostoszowice, Łaziska, Podbucze, Skrbeńsko and Skrzyszów.

Neighbouring gminas
Gmina Godów is bordered by the gminas of Gorzyce, Jastrzębie-Zdrój, Mszana and Wodzisław Śląski. It also borders the Czech Republic.

Twin towns – sister cities

Gmina Godów is twinned with:
 Dolní Lutyně, Czech Republic
 Petrovice u Karviné, Czech Republic
 Stare Miasto, Poland

References

External links

Godow
Wodzisław County